Marisa is a feminine given name.  Like the given name Marissa, the name is derived from the Latin maris, meaning "of the sea".  The name is also a Spanish or Italian contracted familiar nickname for Maria Isabel (Mary Elizabeth) or Maria Luisa (Mary Louise, 'Mary-Lou').

People with this name 
 Marisa Abela (born 1996), English actress
 Marisa Allasio (born 1936), Italian actress
 Marisa Anderson, American guitarist
 Marisa Baena (born 1977), Colombian golfer
 Marisa Barros (born 1980), Portuguese long-distance runner
 Marisa Berenson (born 1946), American actress and model
 Marisa Catalina Casey (born 1979), photographer, graphic designer, educator, and co-author of the book Born in Our Heart
 Marisa Coughlan (born 1973), American actress and writer
 Marisa Fernández (born 1953), Spanish mathematician
 Marisa Ferretti Barth (1931–2021), Canadian senator
  (1933-2003), Brazilian singer
 Marisa Letícia (1950–2017), second wife of former President of Brazil Luis Inácio "Lula" da Silva
 Marisa López (born 1964), Argentine field hockey player
 Marisa Mell (1939–1992), Austrian actress
 Marisa Merlini (1923–2008), Italian actress
 Marisa Miller (born 1978), American model
 Marisa Monte (born 1967), Brazilian  popular singer
 Marisa Papen (born 1992), Belgian model
 Marisa Paredes (born 1946), also known by the surname "Bartolomé", Spanish actress
 Marisa Pavan (born 1932), Italian actress
 Marisa Ramirez (born 1977), American actress
 Mariza (Marisa dos Reis Nunes; born 1973), Portuguese fado singer
 Marisa Robles (born 1937), Spanish harpist
 Marisa Siketa (born 1990), Australian actress
 Marisa Tomei (born 1964), American actress
 Marisa Warrington (born 1973), actress

Fictional characters
 Marisa Coulter, a character from Philip Pullman's His Dark Materials trilogy
 Marisa, a Swordmaster from Fire Emblem: The Sacred Stones
 Marisa Kirisame (霧雨 魔理沙), a fictional magician in numerous Touhou Project games
 Marisa Turner, Countess New Kiev, a character from David Weber's "Honor Harrington" series.
Marisa Sarratore, a minor character from Elena Ferrante's Neapolitan Novels
Marisa, one of the main characters from the Disney Channel series K.C. Undercover

See also
 Marissa (name)

Notes

Italian feminine given names
Portuguese feminine given names
Spanish feminine given names